The Dreamchaser World Tour was the fifth worldwide concert tour by English soprano singer Sarah Brightman in support of her album Dreamchaser (2013). The North American tour had been planned to begin in early 2013, but all dates were rescheduled for late 2013. The tour was supposed to be Brightman's final concert tour before her trip into space (which the Dreamchaser album is based on) but the trip was later cancelled due to personal reasons.

The 2013 North American leg of Brightman's "Dreamchaser" tour consisted of her performing 86 shows over a seven-month time span. It has been her longest tour since the Harem World Tour in 2004, and it was also her worldwide tour with more dates in Asia and South America. Brightman also added dates in countries where she had never performed before, such as United Arab Emirates and Qatar.

In April 2014, a second leg of the North American tour was announced for the summer season; however, on 18 June 2014, Brightman cancelled the summer dates after sustaining an ankle injury. The remainder of the tour ultimately resumed in November 2014, coming to an end a month later.

Production
Brightman anticipated that the tour would be simple; the usual orchestra that accompanied her on previous tours was reduced to four musicians (a guitarist, a pianist,a drummer and a keyboard). The number of dancers was also reduced from being a large number to only two.

The scenery of the stage consisted of a huge screen with tri-dimensional images and videos from space, light, and nature. A raising platform at center of the stage was used by Brightman on several stages of the show. She was joined by Erkan Aki, a Swiss tenor, for singing "Canto della Terra" and "The Phantom of The Opera". During the show, Brightman made ten changes of clothes.

The show lasted two hours with an interlude of twenty minutes, and the track list (plus the encore) had nineteen tracks. The track list of the tour consisted of her well-known songs plus new ones from the Dreamchaser album. As the concert was space-themed, it included various songs from the 2000 album La Luna, which also had a theme related to space.

Set lists
2013 and early 2014 set list
Angel
One Day Like This
Glósóli
Hijo de la Luna
La Luna
Eperdu
It's a Beautiful Day
Ave Maria
Canto della Terra  (with Erkan Aki)
Nessun Dorma
Intermission
Closer
Breathe Me
Figlio Perduto
Kaze no Toorimichi
Scarborough Fair
A Song of India
The Phantom of the Opera (with Erkan Aki)
Time to Say Goodbye
Venus and Mars
A Question of Honour

Late 2014 (Europe second leg & Asia third Leg) set list
 Sanvean Instrumental
 Gothica
 Fleurs du Mal
 Symphony
 Who Wants to Live Forever
 Sarahbande Interlude
 Anytime Anywhere
 Eperdu
 Hijo de la Luna
 La Luna
 It's a Beautiful Day
 Canto della Terra (with Erkan Aki)
 Nessun Dorma
 Closer Instrumental
 Harem
 Breathe Me
 Figlio Perduto
 Scarborough Fair
 A Song of India
 The Phantom of the Opera  (with Erkan Aki)
 Time to Say Goodbye
 A Question of Honour
 Dust in the Wind 
Notes
"Kaze no Toorimichi"  was not performed during the shows in China.
"Deliver Me" was performed as the second encore at the concert taping in London for the PBS special and in the premiere concert in Guangzhou.
"Dust in the Wind" was replaced by "I Believe in Father Christmas" in late December 2014.

Personnel

The performances were directed by director Anthony Van Laast, who worked in Brightman's previous Symphony: Live in Vienna show. The band and dancers comprise some of the world's most respected session musicians and performers.
Band:
Peter Murray – musical director, keys, piano
Mark Pusey – drums & percussion
Olli Cunningham – keys, synths
Gunther Laudahn – guitars, harps, glockenspiel

Dancers:
Jennifer White
Gemma Payne

Guest vocalist:
Erkan Aki

Critical reception

The "Dreamchaser World Tour" received generally positive reviews from critics. The Gazette congratulated Brightman as she dealt with such a small band yet was able to maintain the "majestic mystery" of the performance. The Atlanta Music Scene also reviewed positively the simplicity of the production; "It was the simpler moments when Brightman truly sparkled". Blogcritic.org identified the lightning show as "stunning".

On the review by Twincities.com, the Dreamchaser Tour was described as "enchanting, yet odd", "all the while, stunning". Times Colonist reviewer, Mike Delvin rated Brightman's show with 3.5 stars and wrote: "The show was a spectacle, and the singing was anything but secondary". Buffalo News, in contrast, recognized the purity of Brightman's voice but expected a better elaborated concert. Although many congratulated the simplicity of the performance, other reviews criticized Brightman; Randy Cordova, in azcentral wrote that the show "lacked the outlandish sense of spectacle for which she is known." and compared negatively the simplicity of this tour with the elaboration of the previous. Postcity also criticized Brightman by stating: "All in all, Brightman made terrific use of her high-end stage show, all the while serving up a vocal performance that was just good enough so as not to get completely overshadowed".

Tour dates

References 

Sarah Brightman concert tours
2013 concert tours
2014 concert tours